Natascha Janakieva Petrova (alternate listings: Natasha Petrova, Natasha Yanakieva, born 19 March 1951) is a Bulgarian sprint canoer who competed from the early 1970s to the early 1980s. She won two medals in the K-4 500 m event at the ICF Canoe Sprint World Championships with a gold in 1977 and a silver in 1978. 

Petrova also competed in three Summer Olympics, earning her best finish of seventh in the K-2 500 m event at Montreal in 1976.

References

External links
 

1951 births
Bulgarian female canoeists
Canoeists at the 1972 Summer Olympics
Canoeists at the 1976 Summer Olympics
Canoeists at the 1980 Summer Olympics
Living people
Olympic canoeists of Bulgaria
ICF Canoe Sprint World Championships medalists in kayak